Psychotria sordida is a species of plant in the family Rubiaceae. It is endemic to Sri Lanka.

Trunk
Branchlets slender.

References

sordida
Flora of Sri Lanka
Endangered plants
Taxonomy articles created by Polbot